Carnie Henry Smith (January 29, 1911 – January 25, 1979) was an American football player and coach.  Smith was the seventh head football coach at Pittsburg State University in Pittsburg, Kansas.  He held that position for 18  seasons, from 1949 until 1966, compiling a record of 116–52–6. His teams were declared the NAIA National Football Champions in 1957 and 1961. The football stadium at Pittsburg State is named Carnie Smith Stadium in his honor.

Head coaching record

References

External links
 

1911 births
1979 deaths
American football quarterbacks
Kansas Jayhawks football players
Pittsburg State Gorillas football coaches
Pittsburg State Gorillas athletic directors
People from Cherokee County, Kansas